The Ritz Ybor (originally the Rivoli Theatre) is an events venue located in the historic Ybor City, within Tampa, Florida. Opening in 1917, the theatre catered to the Afro-Cuban community in the emerging neighborhood. Throughout the years, the venue was served as a cinema, adult movie theater, nightclub and concert venue. The theatre was transformed into its current incarnation in 2008; becoming one of Tampa's premier live music and events venue.

History

In 1917, the building opened as the Rivoli Theatre, a red brick building with a silent movie theater on the first floor and various apartments on the second floor. It was the first theater of its kind in the United States. In 1931, the building underwent an expansion and reopened as The Ritz Theatre. It continued to show a variety of standard films until December 31, 1965, when it transitioned to nude shows and XXX-rated films. 

In September 1983, developer William E. Field purchased the building and remodeled it once again. Field’s ambitions never materialized, and a bank foreclosure in 1987 forced him to close his doors. That same year, the building was leased to The Masquerade nightclub. As Masquerade, the venue saw the performances of a variety of rising alternative acts. In 1988, the Capitano family purchased the building as an investment property. In 1973 and 1989, Ybor City was listed on the National Register of Historic Places and the National Historic Landmark District, respectively. This building was listed as a contribution in both entries. In 2006, the Masquerade tenants were evicted. The building underwent a $2 million renovation and on June 26, 2008 opened its doors as The Ritz Ybor, a special events and live music venue.

The building is located in the heart of historic Ybor City. The Ritz Ybor is a short trolley ride away from the Channelside district, two to three miles from downtown Tampa and a 15-minute car ride from Tampa International Airport. It is located within walking distance of the Centro Ybor Entertainment Complex and the Ybor City Hillsborough County Community College campus.

Venue
The three rooms inside the venue are the Royal Room, the Rivoli Room and the Theatre Ballroom. The Theatre Ballroom has a  theatrical stage. The Grand Foyer, which connects all three rooms, houses the original terrazzo floors, art deco mirrors and wall sconces.

Noted performers

Aboogie
Phish
Mos Def
Ice-T
The Smashing Pumpkins
The Killers
Icona Pop
Miguel
Nirvana
The Sugarcubes
Jane's Addiction
Foo Fighters
Nine Inch Nails
De La Soul
Lady Gaga
Tiësto
Purity Ring
Robyn
Fleet Foxes
Glass Animals
Foster the People
Kesha
Melanie Martinez
Dave Matthews Band
Neon Trees
Manchester Orchestra
Dashboard Confessional
NOFX
Taking Back Sunday
Yellowcard
Tech N9ne
AFI
Gwar
Twenty One Pilots
Die Antwoord
Dropkick Murphys
Panic! at the Disco
Type O Negative
KMFDM

References

1917 establishments in Florida
Buildings and structures in Tampa, Florida
Music of Tampa, Florida
Music venues in Florida